Doyle v Olby (Ironmongers) Ltd [1969] 2 QB 158 is an English contract law case concerning fraudulent misrepresentation. It illustrates and emphasizes the differing measures of damages for deceit and breach of contract.

Facts
Herbert Doyle bought a business from Olby (Ironmongers) Ltd at 12, Upper High Street, Epsom, Surrey. Doyle was told the business was ‘all over the counter’. In reality, half the shop's business came via their travelling sales representative, and Doyle sustained heavy losses. The judge awarded £1500 in deceit, based on two and a half times the cost of employing a part-time rep at £600 p.a., as equivalent to the cost of making good the representation or the reduction in the value of the goodwill. Doyle appealed.

Judgment

Lord Denning MR increased the damages to £5500. He said Doyle could claim for all damage flowing directly from the deceit which was not rendered too remote by Doyle's own conduct, whether or not the defendants could have foreseen such consequential loss. The plaintiff's position before the fraudulent inducement should be compared with his position at the end of the transaction. He said damages for fraud and conspiracy are differently assessed from those for breach of contract,

References

External links
 "Contract" - F.R. Davies - Sweet & Maxell

English misrepresentation case law
Lord Denning cases
1969 in British law
Court of Appeal (England and Wales) cases
1969 in case law